Khok Katiam Air Force Base  is a Royal Thai Air Force (RTAF) base, the home of 2nd Wing Air Command. It in Mueang Lopburi District, in Lopburi Province, Thailand.

References

External links

Royal Thai Air Force bases
Buildings and structures in Lopburi province